The canton of Gourdon is an administrative division of the Lot department, southern France. Its borders were modified at the French canton reorganisation which came into effect in March 2015. Its seat is in Gourdon.

It consists of the following communes:
 
Anglars-Nozac
Cazals
Dégagnac
Gindou
Gourdon
Lavercantière
Léobard
Marminiac
Milhac
Payrignac
Rampoux
Rouffilhac
Saint-Cirq-Madelon
Saint-Cirq-Souillaguet
Saint-Clair
Saint-Projet
Salviac
Le Vigan

References

Cantons of Lot (department)